Ángela Susana Pereda Estrada (born 18 June 1950), known professionally as Susana Estrada, is a Spanish actress, vedette, and singer. She is considered one of the most uninhibited and provocative sex symbols from the era of the Spanish transition to democracy, and one of the most prominent actresses of "".

Biography
From a mining family, Susana Estrada resided in Gijón, where she worked as a librarian at the Ateneo Jovellanos. In the early 1970s she decided to move to Madrid to start her artistic career, beginning with modest incursions into café-théâtre. After a short time she had small roles in films by directors such as José Luis Merino (El Zorro de Monterrey, 1971), Benito Alazraki (Las tres perfectas casadas, 1973), Tomás Aznar (El libro de buen amor, alongside her cousin Blanca Estrada), Jorge Grau (1975), and Amando de Ossorio (Night of the Seagulls, 1975).

Rise to fame
In 1976, only a few months after the death of Francisco Franco – and with it the end of his regime's censorship – Estrada presented "the most daring show in Madrid", Historias de "Strip-Tease", at the Videoset Theater at No. 5 Calle de la Princesa. In it, alluding to the film Gilda in which Rita Hayworth sensually removes a single glove, Estrada removed everything except that garment. This made her the first Spanish actress to perform completely nude onstage (María José Goyanes and  had previously shown their breasts, in Equus and  respectively), marking a transgressive sexual milestone of the time.

The same year, she began editing a sexology advice column in Play Lady magazine. Her opinions were considered so immoral that she was prosecuted 14 times for creating a public scandal and sanctioned with a fine, withdrawal of her passport, disqualification from public office, and loss of the right to vote until 1988, "to the point of being forced to have four bodyguards".
 
But, far from being intimidated, the actress continued to appear nude in numerous magazines, such as Interviú (in "desnuda en familia", August 1976), Climax, Papillon, and Solo para hombres. The erotic fotonovela El sexo de Susana was published in the latter in 1979, with episodes titled Entre mis jóvenes muslos (II), Dulce sexo de Lesbos (III), La magia del deseo (VII), and Placeres crueles (VIII). In her public statements, she made it clear that she does not take off her clothes because of "demands of the script", but because she feels like it and, above all, because she considers that the equality of women must begin with total disinhibition when it comes to showing their bodies in public and sexual activity without prohibitions.

From 1977 to 1981, she starred in a series of films of high erotic content, such as El jovencito Drácula (1977), Sexy… amor y fantasía (Juan Xiol, 1977, with ), and Pepito piscinas (Luis María Delgado, 1978, with Fernando Esteso). She became known for appearing in films which were rated "S", indicating sexual content that went beyond the simple exposure of a nipple. At the same time she released some singles, such as "¡Gózame ya!", "Hagámoslo juntos", "¡Quítate el sostén!", "Tócame", "Voy desnuda, Mi chico favorito", and "Qué calor!", the last two of which were rated "S" for their pornographic content.

Also in 1978, the book Susana Estrada húmedo sexo was published by her representative Carlos de las Heras, in which the author describes the artist's sex life in detail, and for which he was sentenced in August 1984 to a month and a day of major arrest, disqualification, and a fine of 40,000 pesetas.

"Don't catch cold"
The image that triggered Estrada's greatest media notoriety was taken on 14 February 1978 during an awards ceremony promoted by the defunct newspaper , in which the actress is seen collecting one of the awards from the then leader of the People's Socialist Party, Enrique Tierno Galván, at the moment when one of her breasts "came out without thinking." She later claimed, "the jacket was opened and I just let the photographers do their work." The future mayor of Madrid warned her, "don't catch cold."

Other scandals
In early 1979, the musical show Muñecas was staged at the Muñoz Seca Theater in Madrid, under the direction of Andrés Magdaleno, and in which Estrada's partner was a libidinous "robot" with which she simulated sex in different positions.

On 13 July, Estrada was the subject of a new controversy as a result of her conversation about sex with the priest and writer  on the La 1 program Mano a mano. This gave rise to a campaign by reactionary elements to force the resignation of the then general director of the public entity, .

Six years later, she presented the supershow Machos 87 at the Pasapoga music hall. This time, a kind of gigantic phallus was placed between her legs that she inserted into the anus of one of the dancers. The show reaches its climax when the actress is "crucified".

Later career
Susana Estrada divides her time between Madrid and Benidorm, where she has a music and comedy show.

In addition to her singles from the 1970s and early 1980s, she released the album The Sexadelic Disco Funk Sound of… Susana Estrada in 2017.

Works

Selected television appearances

Filmography

Selected discography

References

External links
 
 

1950 births
20th-century Spanish actresses
20th-century Spanish singers
21st-century Spanish actresses
21st-century Spanish singers
Actors from Asturias
Singers from Asturias
Living people
People from Gijón
Spanish musical theatre actresses
Spanish pornographic film actresses
Spanish vedettes
20th-century Spanish women singers
21st-century Spanish women singers